London Chamber of Commerce and Industry (LCCI) is London’s key hub for the business community, we support members’ businesses through a range of services, advocate on behalf of London’s business community in the most important forums of policy debate, and promote ‘Global London’ as the best city in the world to do business – whether that’s to trade, invest, learn, or find new commercial partners.

We work to accelerate the growth of our members by providing valuable support, facilitating new business connections, and leveraging our network to generate greater shared prosperity for London.

The Chamber have a range of interest groups designed to provide targeted support services to business communities, including: Asian Business Association (ABA), Black Business Association (BBA) and Business Owners Club.

LCCI introduced a free B2B digital networking app in 2021 to facilitate digital connections across the capital. On the LCCI Community App, you can chat with peers, join sector and common interest groups, and discover LCCI member product and services offers.

History
John Weskett ran a London chamber from 1782 to 1800, a larger chamber ran in 1823 and 1824, with support from MP and Bank of England director, William Haldimand, and other prominent people, and several other short-lived attempts were made until the current chamber was founded in 1882.

The LCC was a prominent supporter of calls for an Imperial Federation. In 1886 they funded a competition for the best essay "formulating a practical working plan of the federation and the mother-country". The prize was set at £50 and a size limit of 75 pages were set. 106 entries  were received and judged by a panel consisting of James Anthony Froude, Sir Rawson W. Rawson and Professor John Robert Seeley. The competition was won by William Henry Parr Greswell, a former professor of classical studies at Cape University. A final essay by Reverend Dalton, a canon in Windsor was expanded and published later.

In 1903, the LCCI established its first arbitration scheme for the resolution of commercial disputes, called the London Chamber of Arbitration. In 2020, this was re-formed as the London Chamber of Arbitration and Mediation (LCAM).

References

External links
 

1881 establishments in England
1881 in London
Business organisations based in London
Chambers of commerce in the United Kingdom
City of London
Economy of London
Organizations established in 1881